Lindsay Transit provides bus service to the community of Lindsay, the main population centre in the City of Kawartha Lakes in east-central Ontario, Canada.

There are three routes, Red, Green, and Blue, which operate Monday to Saturday between 7:00 am and 7:00 pm, Sundays from 9:00am to 4:00pm. No Holiday service. Like many small systems the buses run on one way loops to maximize coverage of the service area using the minimum of resources and meet at a downtown terminus. The buses are garaged at the City Works Depot at 89 St. David Street.

Routes
Red- Via Russell Street, Wolfe Street, Lindsay Street, Melbourne Street, Alberts Street, Angeline Street, McGibbon Boulevard, Mary Street, Kent Street
Green- Via William Street, Dyana Drive, Found Avenue, Victoria Avenue, Kent Street, Adelaide Street, Orchard Park Road, Angeline Street
Blue- Via Kent Street, St. Paul Street, Needham Street, St. David Street, St. George Street, Queen Street, Parkside Drive, Logie Street, Russell Street, Alberts Street, Adelaide Street, Kent Street, McLaughlin Road, St. Joseph Road, Colborne Street

See also

 Public transport in Canada

References

External links
 Transit History of Lindsay, Ontario

Transit agencies in Ontario
Transport in Kawartha Lakes